The Spoornet Class 17E of 1993 was a South African electric locomotive.

During 1993 and 1994, Spoornet modified several Class 6E1, Series 7, 8 and 9 locomotives to improve their braking and traction reliability for service on the Natal mainline. These modified locomotives were reclassified to Class 17E.

Manufacturer
The 3 kV DC Class 6E1 electric locomotive was built for the South African Railways (SAR) by Union Carriage & Wagon (UCW) in Nigel, Transvaal, with electrical equipment supplied by the General Electric Company (GEC). UCW did not allocate works numbers to the locomotives which it built for the SAR, but used the SAR unit numbers for their record keeping.

Characteristics

Bogies

The Class 6E1 was built with sophisticated traction linkages on their bogies. Together with the locomotive's electronic wheel-slip detection system, these traction struts, mounted between the linkages on the bogies and the locomotive body and colloquially referred to as grasshopper legs, ensured the maximum transfer of power to the rails without causing wheel-slip by reducing the adhesion of the leading bogie and increasing that of the trailing bogie by as much as 15% upon starting. This feature was controlled by electronic wheel-slip detection devices and an electric weight transfer relay which reduced the anchor current to the leading bogie by as much as 50A in notches 2 to 16.

Brakes
The locomotive itself used air brakes, but it was equipped to operate trains with air or vacuum brakes. While hauling a vacuum braked train, the locomotive's air brake system would be disabled and the train would be controlled by using the train brakes alone to slow down and stop. While hauling an air braked train, on the other hand, the locomotive brakes would engage along with the train brakes. While working either type of train downgrade, the locomotive's regenerative braking system would also work in conjunction with the train brakes.

When the locomotive was stopped, the air brakes on both bogies were applied together. The handbrake or parking brake, located in cab no. 2, only operated on the unit's last axle, or no. 7 and 8 wheels.

Orientation
These dual cab locomotives had a roof access ladder on one side only, just to the right of the cab access door. The roof access ladder end was marked as the no. 2 end. A corridor along the centre of the locomotive connected the cabs, which were identical apart from the fact that the handbrake was located in cab 2. A pantograph hook stick was stowed in a tube mounted below the lower edge of the locomotive body on the roof access ladder side.

Modification to Class 17E
Class 17E locomotives were modified and reclassified from Class 6E1, Series 7, 8 or 9 locomotives during 1993 and 1994. Key modifications included improved regenerative braking and wheel-slip control to improve their reliability on the steep grades and curves of the KwaZulu-Natal mainline.

A stumbling block was that the regeneration equipment at many of the sub-stations along the route was unreliable and since there was no guarantee that another train would be in the same section to absorb the regenerated energy, there was always the risk that line voltage could exceed 4.1 kV, which would make either the sub-station or the locomotive trip out. As a result, the subsequently rebuilt Class 18E locomotives were not equipped with regenerative braking.

Unlike the Class 16E locomotives, which were renumbered and reclassified but otherwise unmodified semi-permanently coupled pairs of Class 6E1, Series 3 to Series 9 locomotives that merely had their no. 1 end cabs abandoned in terms of maintenance, the Class 17Es retained their original unit numbers after reclassification, but with a "17E" marking applied below the locomotive's unit number behind the driver's side window.

Apart from the "17E" markings, they were visually indistinguishable from unmodified Class 6E1s. Those in SAR Gulf Red and yellow whiskers livery that still carried number plates even still showed "6E1" on the plates. Altogether 139 Class 6E1 locomotives were modified to Class 17E, of which 14 were Series 7, 55 Series 8 and 70 .

Rebuilding to Class 18E

In 2000, Spoornet began a project to rebuild Series 2 to 11 Class 6E1 locomotives to Class 18E, Series 1 and Series 2 at the Transnet Rail Engineering (TRE) workshops at Koedoespoort. In the process the cab at the no. 1 end was stripped of all controls and the driver's front and side windows were blanked off to have a toilet installed, thereby forfeiting the locomotive's bi-directional ability.

Since the driving cab's noise level had to be below 85 decibels, cab 2 was selected as the Class 18E driving cab, primarily based on its lower noise level compared to cab 1 which was closer and more exposed to the compressor's noise and vibration. Another factor was the closer proximity of cab 2 to the low voltage switch panel. The fact that the handbrake was located in cab 2 was not a deciding factor, but was considered an additional benefit.

While the earlier Class 6E1, Series 2 to 7 locomotives had been built with a brake system which consisted of various valves connected to each other with pipes and commonly referred to as a "bicycle frame" brake system, the Class 6E1, Series 8 to 11 locomotives were built with an air equipment frame brake system, commonly referred to as a brake rack. Since the design of the rebuilt Class 18E locomotives included the same brake rack, the rebuilding project was begun with the newer series 8 to 11 locomotives to reduce the overall cost of rebuilding. 

Between 2002 and 2007, all but three of the Class 17Es were rebuilt to Class 18E, Series 1. The exceptions are numbers E1778, E1803 and E2035, which are presumed to have been scrapped. The table lists their Class 6E1 series and numbers, Class 18E numbers and year of rebuilding.

Illustration
The main picture shows Class 17E no. E1826, ex Class 6E1, Series 7, at Capital Park in Pretoria on 28 September 2006. The "17E" markings below the locomotive numbers on this and the following picture were the only means to visually distinguish Class 17E locomotives from unmodified Class 6E1 locomotives.

References

External links

Bo-Bo locomotives
Cape gauge railway locomotives
Electric locomotives of South Africa
Railway locomotives introduced in 1993
Transnet Rail Engineering locomotives
Union Carriage & Wagon locomotives